Cognitive Surplus: How Technology Makes Consumers into Collaborators is a 2010 non-fiction book by Clay Shirky, originally published in with the subtitle "Creativity and Generosity in a Connected Age". The book is an indirect sequel to Shirky's Here Comes Everybody, which covered the impact of social media. Cognitive Surplus focuses on describing the free time that individuals have to engage with collaborative activities within new media. Shirky's text searches to prove that global transformation can come from individuals committing their time to active engagement with technology. Overall response has been mixed with some critics praising Shirky's insights but also decrying some of the shortcomings of his theory.

Background 
Clay Shirky has long been interested in and published works concerning the Internet and its impact on society.  He currently works at New York University, where he "has been making the case that the Internet is an inherently participatory and social medium".

Shirky wrote this book two years after its predecessor, Here Comes Everybody, which relates to the topics of the Internet and organization of people, was published.  In it, Shirky argues that "As the Internet radically reduces the costs of collective action for everyone, it will transform the relationship between ordinary individuals and the large, hierarchical institutions that were a dominant force in 20th-century societies". This transformation of relationships between individuals is a concept Shirky builds on in Cognitive Surplus.   A central concern Shirky had in mind when writing it was in illuminating the difference between communal and civic values, and how the Internet is a vehicle for both. In particular, he was interested in showing "effusions of people pooling their spare time and talent" and showing how we can create a culture "that celebrates the creation of civic value".

Shirky has stated that he is interested in exploring "the changes in the way people collaborate" that are spurred on by technology and new media, and these changes are a large part of what Cognitive Surplus is devoted to examining. Topics that Shirky frequently writes about include Network Economics, Media and Community, Internet Globalization, and Open Source Software. He has also been featured in many magazines and journals including The New York Times, Wall Street Journal and Harvard Business Review.

Summary
Shirky argues that since the 1940s, people are learning how to use free time more constructively for creative acts rather than consumptive ones, particularly with the advent of online tools that allow new forms of collaboration. While Shirky acknowledges that the activities that we use our cognitive surplus for may be frivolous (such as creating LOLcats), the trend as a whole is leading to valuable and influential new forms of human expression. These forms of human collaboration that he argues the Internet provides take the form of four categories of varying degrees of value:  personal, communal, public, and civic. Shirky argues that while all of these are legitimate uses of "cognitive surplus", the civic value (the power to actually change society) that social media provides is what should be celebrated about the Internet.

Chapter summaries

Gin, Television, and Cognitive Surplus 
Shirky introduces the Gin Craze as an older version of a modern-day concern. Gin offered its consumers the ability to fall apart a little bit at a time. He relates this to how society today deals with free time in relation to technology. Since the Second World War, increases in GDP, educational attainment, and life span have forced industrialized world to grapple with something we'd never had to deal with on a national scale: free time. He claims that the sitcom, along with other technology and social media, has become the modern day Gin Craze. Something that makes today remarkable is that we can treat free time as a general social asset that can be harnessed for large, communally created projects. Society never knows what to do with a surplus at first (hence "surplus"). The "Milkshake Mistake" is the idea that it is a mistake to look at the meaning of or potential of something by looking at the history and original purpose of a product (such as drinking milkshakes for breakfast). Shirky says we do this when thinking about media. The use of technology is much less determined by the tool/medium itself; when we use a network, the most important asset we get is access to one another. Ushahidi was one of the first examples of a program in response to this surplus of free time being used for a greater good (cognitive surplus). It was a service developed to help citizens track outbreaks of ethnic violence in Kenya. It grew to a bigger and better at reporting over a wide geographical area as a result of cognitive surplus. It brought people together to carve out enough collective good-will from the community to create resources that no one could have imagined years ago. Along with good-will acts, people with a surplus of free time also engage in the use of creativity (ICanHasCheezburger). Cognitive surplus, newly forced from previously disconnected island of time and talent, is just raw material. To get any value out of it, Shirky says, we have to make it mean something or be useful. We collectively aren't just a source of the surplus; we are also the people designing its use by our participation and by the things we expect of one another as we wrestle together with our new connectedness.

Means 
In the second chapter, Shirky discusses the impact of media on the personal lives of civilians, companies, and governments. Throughout the text, Shirky references the 2008 Beef Revolts in South Korea and how they came about since they were led by K-pop fan girls. Shirky also referenced PickupPal and the tension between it and bus company Trentway-Wagar, who complained about the latter to the OHTB. Shirky discusses the publishing button and whether or not should exist since now anyone can publish. He references Naomi Wolf's The Beauty Myth and Harvey Swados and uses them as part of his argument. He also brings up ICanHasCheezeBurger, YouTube, and AOL as well, all of which are platforms that anyone can use. Shirky compares all of this to the fifteenth century invention of the printing press and also lists other forms of life-changing media, including photographic plates, CDs, radio, and television.

Motive 
In the third chapter, Shirky explains that the means are platforms, tools, or systems we use that allow us to connect, learn, and share. The combination of time, place, and people which enable us to share and take action, is the opportunity. Shirky discusses the types of motivations that a person who shares would consider. Intrinsic motivations, which Shirky summarizes as a need for 1) increased competence, 2) autonomy over what we do, 3) membership of a group who share our values and beliefs, 4) the sharing of things with that group. Then, extrinsic motivations, like reward and recognition or punishment for certain behaviors. These motivations could also be classified into personal and social motivations. Social motivations include membership and sharing, while personal motivations include competence and autonomy. With the evidence from Benkler and Nissenbaum, it is concluded that social motivations reinforce personal ones. With the tools of today, we see many new groups; most of them large, public, and amateur groups. The goal for these groups is more about scope rather than size. The use of this public access media is to reach audiences that are like the group. Sharers have always had the same interests-or motivations- it is the opportunity that has changed them, and the ability to connect, share, and learn easily.

Opportunity 
In the fourth chapter, Shirky explores how means and motives alone cannot explain new uses for our cognitive surplus, explaining that we take the opportunities made available to us. He argues that we often discover unconventional routes to benefit society. Shirky cites examples such as the elderly adopting the Internet as new means for communication and skateboarders adapting drained swimming pools into skating ramps. The narrative about the drought-stricken pools proved an important point: the intended capabilities of something do not necessarily determine its functions. He goes on to discuss the Ultimatum game, in which a proposer and responder are given the task of splitting ten dollars. According to behavioral economics, proposers should always propose a split that heavily favors them and the responder should always accept it, because no matter how small their share is, there is still a gain. In practice, however, proposers tend to offer fair deals and responders tend to reject unfair proposals. On some level, we always feel we are in a social situation and will either treat each other fairly or punish those who do not. According to Shirky, this is why what he describes as the Public sector is so popular; it is designed to enrich society without any monetary incentive. In the public sector, digital networks connect people worldwide and give amateurs the opportunity to share their thoughts and work when they normally couldn't. There are no gatekeepers on the Internet; innovation is actively encouraged and younger generations in a changing environment can find their voice there.

Culture 
The fifth chapter is broken up into four parts, Culture as a Coordinating Tool, The Economics of Sharing, College Professors and Brain Surgeons, and Patients Like Us.  The first section of the chapter discusses an experiment that appeared in a paper published in the Journal of Legal Studies, written by Uri Gneezy and Aldo Rustichini.  The experiment demonstrates the backfiring of an attempt to regulate group collaboration; when attempting to do so by ascribing monetary values to people's time, a community will then begin to view people who provide services as the service itself rather than as individuals.  This emphasizes Shirky's point that group collaboration is essential to its prosperity and functionality.  Another example he uses is The Invisible College, an example of collaboration that resulted in a monumental scientific advancements because of the sense of a shared purpose.  Unlike the alchemists of their time, The Invisible College shared information with each other in order to further the field rather than claim individual advancements as their own.  Later Shirky emphasizes the sense of belonging that is an intricate part of this group culture.  In his brain surgeon analogy he discusses the values of a professional versus an amateur, and that while in the case of the brain surgeon people prefer the professional, this is not always the case; for instance, in cases such as food critics, people tend to prefer an outlet where ordinary people give their opinions.  He likens to the distinction between the services offered by a prostitute (professional at their craft) versus the intimacy between partners, demonstrating that a sense of belonging is often held in a higher regard than skill.  This sense of belonging opens up a new discussion with the example of patientslikeme.com in which patients of similar diseases can openly discuss their ailments and feel comfort in knowing that they are not the only ones experiencing it.  Furthermore, it allows researchers to collaborate with patients.  Thus demonstrating that social media platforms can be used to enhance this nature of belonging in culture, but can also produce real civic value.

Personal, Communal, Public, Civic 
In the sixth chapter, Shirky outlines the variations in the forms of sharing and the types of value that result. He argues that there are four main values: personal, communal, public, and civic. Personal value deals with the efforts of singular agents sharing ideas on a whim.  Communal value is sharing in a small group that serves the interests of the group members collaborating.  Public value deals with groups that share in order to produce projects that serve people outside of the group.  Civic value is when groups collaborate on a project that serves to benefit society at large.  Point being that value is determined on who is involved and the intended benefactors of their efforts and level of cooperation that is upheld amongst the group, and that ultimately cognitive surplus is the driving factor behind such efforts.  The impact of the efforts can be as minuscule (personal) as sharing a selfie with the world, to Hashtags that are created to garner large followings and support to the issues that can change the world.

Looking for the Mouse 
In the seventh and final chapter, Shirky starts to work towards his conclusion of how his novel is a resource and how society may utilize it. He references the happenings of the Post-World War II era and the resulting transformation that society endured. Shirky notes from Steven Weber's book The Success of Open Source that lesser costs nor technical quality are worthy explanations for why someone would collaborate on an open source project. Shirky states that there is a paradox in revolution in which is the result of someone being able to change the future of a previously-existing society. He also references other media that revolutionized human conversation, stating that PLATO, a computer system that existed in the 1960s, was the ancestor of today's electronic devices. He also shares with his readers that SixDegrees was the first social networking website, not Facebook and Friendster as everyone had previously thought. He makes several recommendations to his readers, some of them being that to know that it's impractical to start complex, start small, ask questions, and note that behavior is in pursuit of opportunity.

Critical reception
The negative criticisms largely address the issue of negative uses of cognitive surplus. For example, Shirky discusses lolcats in the book, but this is a pretty innocuous example of negative or trite uses of cognitive surplus, especially considering the reality of cyber crimes, and other far more drastically negative uses. The main criticism of Shirky is that he is not realistic about the many possible ways we might waste this cognitive surplus, or worse, the many terrible ways it can and is being used for destructive and criminal activities, for example the global Jihadist movement. On the positive side, Shirky is praised for explaining the potential opportunities we can harness. He shows us effectively that we can not only make better use of our time, but also, that technology enables us to do so in a way that maximizes our ability to share and communicate.

Positive
One critic Russell Davies writes, "There are revealing thoughts in every chapter and they're particularly important for people trying to do business on the internet, because they shed light on some fundamental motivations and forces that we often miss or misconstrue".  Sorin Adam Matei of Purdue University, West Lafayette writes, "Despite shortcomings, Cognitive Surplus remains overall a very well-written and generally well-informed contribution to our discussion about the social effects of social media. The academic research that shapes some of its assumptions and conclusions is well translated in everyday language," Davies describes Shirky as "the best and most helpful writer about the internet and society there is." He praised the book for elucidating the power of new technology for business. Davies says Shirky elucidated the personal/public media distinction "That explains a lot to me. It's obvious when you read it but failing to grasp the fused state of public/personal media is responsible for a lot of the things we get wrong online. We often take it to be a commercial, public media space (and we always seem to be looking for another small group of professionals out there to deal with)—but it's not just that. Things that are perfectly appropriate in public media just don't work in personal media. You wouldn't steam open people's letters and insert magazines ads, but that's sometimes how we seem to behave."
Upon its release, Cognitive Surplus was praised by Tom Chatfield of The Guardian and James Harkin of The Financial Times who both are complimentary of Shirkey's depiction of the Internet and its effect on society.

Negative
His approach has been criticized by Farhad Manjoo in The New York Times for being too academic and for cheerleading positive examples of the online use of cognitive surplus. Similarly, Lehmann describes it as "the latest, monotonous installment in the sturdy tradition of exuberant web yay-saying."

Lehmann's review compares the contradictions Shirky makes in his argument about quality being democratized to hailing "a cascade of unrefereed digital content as a breakthrough in creativity and critical thought is roughly akin to greeting news of a massive national egg recall by laying off the country's food inspectors." Moreover, he objects to Shirky's selective use of anecdotes to support his point.  Meanwhile, he finds it disorienting and obscene to suggest the web is hailing a new economy and abolishing class in the midst of financial distress and joblessness. He also questions Shirky's assumption that free time was squandered prior to the web and suggests instead people did useful things with their time. Furthermore, he questions the intrinsic value of time spent online as a lot of time spent online may be used for things like gambling and porn. There's nothing innately compassionate or generous about the web. For any good thing people do online, someone could also be doing something bad with the internet.

Lehmann also suggests that a cognitive surplus raises a question about what the baseline value of time spent was to begin with, "one", he claims "that might be better phrased as either 'Surplus for what?' or 'Whose surplus, white man? In the same vein, Lehmann accuses Shirky of being myopic. Shirky says the worst thing on the web is LOLcats when actually there are some bad things such as, for example, fake Obama birth certificates. Shirky says you cannot communicate with society on the basis of a web search to which Lehmann responds,
The idea of society as a terminally unresponsive, nonconversant entity would certainly be news to the generations of labor and gender-equality advocates who persistently engaged the social order with demands for the ballot and the eight-hour workday. It would likewise ring strangely in the ears of the leaders of the civil rights movement, who used a concerted strategy of nonviolent protest as a means of addressing an abundance-obsessed white American public who couldn't find the time to regard racial inequality as a pressing social concern. The explicit content of such protests, meanwhile, indicted that same white American public on the basis of the civic and political standards—or rather double standards—of equality and opportunity that fueled the nation's chauvinist self-regard.
Shirky bases a lot of his conclusions of generosity on the Ultimatum Game experiment to which Lehmann objects "The utility of the Ultimatum Game for a new market enabled theory of human nature thins out considerably when one realizes that the players are bartering with unearned money." and if you "Consult virtually any news story following up on a lottery winner's post-windfall life—to say nothing of the well-chronicled implosion of the past decade's market in mortgage backed securities—and you'll get a quick education in how playing games with other people's money can have a deranging effect on human behavior."

Lehmann also criticizes Shirky's expectation of the web to change economics and governmental systems. For example, he criticizes Shirky's idealising of amateurism:
As for crowdsourcing being a "labor of love" (Shirky primly reminds us that the term "amateur" "derives from the Latin amare—'to love), the governing metaphor here wouldn't seem to be digital sharecropping so much as the digital plantation. For all too transparent reasons of guilt sublimation, patrician apologists for antebellum slavery also insisted that their uncompensated workers loved their work, and likewise embraced their overseers as virtual family members. This is not, I should caution, to brand Shirky as a latter-day apologist for slavery but rather to note that it's an exceptionally arrogant tic of privilege to tell one's economic inferiors, online or off, what they do and do not love, and what the extra-material wellsprings of their motivation are supposed to be. To use an old-fashioned Enlightenment construct, it's at minimum an intrusion into a digital contributor's private life—even in the barrier-breaking world of Web 2.0 oversharing and friending. The just and proper rejoinder to any propagandist urging the virtues of uncompensated labor from an empyrean somewhere far above mere "society" is, "You try it, pal."
The idea of crowdsourcing as a more egalitarian economic tool also draws criticism saying crowdsourcing is just cost-cutting, much akin to outsourcing. The possibility for the web to fundamentally change the government is also questioned as
Cognitive Surplus is already aging badly, with the WikiLeaks furor showing just how little web-based traffic in raw information, no matter how revelatory or embarrassing, has upended the lumbering agendas of the old nation-state on the global chessboard of realpolitik—a place where everything has a price, often measured in human lives. More than that, though, Shirky's book inadvertently reminds us of the lesson we should have absorbed more fully with the 2000 collapse of the high-tech market: the utopian enthusiasms of our country's cyber-elite exemplify not merely what the historian E.P. Thompson called "the enormous condescension of posterity" but also a dangerous species of economic and civic illiteracy.
The Western Cold War attitude has spawned a delusion about the power of information spreading to topple authoritarian regimes. This will not be the case in Eastern countries. Paul Barrett takes a similar though softer stance, claiming all of Shirky's examples are relatively tame and mildly progressive. Moreover, Shirky presents everything as civic change when some things such as carpooling services are really stretching the term.

According to Matei, "A broader conclusion of the book is that converting 'cognitive surplus' into social capital and collective action is the product of technologies fueled by the passion of affirming the individual need for autonomy and competence." His enthusiasm for social media and for the Internet produces at times overly drawn statements. Author Jonah Lehrer criticized what he saw as Shirky's premise that forms of consumption, cultural consumption in particular, are inherently less worthy than producing and sharing.

Further reading
Tenner, E. (2010). No Brainer? The Wilson Quarterly, 34(4): 92-95. 
Tomlinson, B., Silberman, M. Six (2012). The cognitive surplus is made of fossil fuels. First Monday, 17(11): November 5. 
 In this essay, Tomlinson argues for the validity of Shirky's cognitive surplus and theorizes that cognitive surplus is created partly because machines do all the work people used to do. Because all of these machines run on oil, cognitive surplus is actually incredibly taxing on the environment. Tomlinson goes on to argue that as long as our cognitive surplus is powered by fossil fuels, it cannot be sustained.
Drive, Daniel H. Pink
 The Shallows, Nicholas G. Carr
 Connecting Informal and Formal Learning Experiences in an Age of Participatory Media, Glen Bull

References

External links
 How cognitive surplus will change the world, Shirky's 2010 TED talk
 Cognitive Surplus: The Great Spare-Time Revolution, Wired
Presentation by Shirky on Cognitive Surplus at Google Headquarters, Mountain View, California, June 25, 2010, C-SPAN

2010 non-fiction books
Technology books
Social media
Works about the information economy
Books about the Internet